Primary form is used in surface metrology to refer to the over-all shape of a surface which can be measured quantitatively.

References

Metrology